Alma Rock Phillips (1890 - 20 December 1966) was an Australian actress of stage and screen. She appeared in a number of early Australian silent films. She was the daughter of Rock Phillips.

Select film credits
For Australia (1915)
In the Last Stride (1916)
The Pioneers (1916)
The Monk and the Woman (1917)
A Rough Passage (1922)

Select theatre credits
Turn to the Right (1918)
The Rose of Killarney

References

External links
 1918 photo of Alma Rock Phillips
 

Australian film actresses
Australian silent film actresses
20th-century Australian actresses
19th-century Australian women
1890s births
1966 deaths